Events during the year 1994 in Northern Ireland.

Incumbents
 Secretary of State - Patrick Mayhew

Events
2 June - 1994 Scotland RAF Chinook crash: A Royal Air Force Chinook helicopter carrying almost all the United Kingdom's senior Northern Ireland intelligence experts, crashes on the Mull of Kintyre, Scotland, killing all 25 passengers and 4 crew members.
18 June - Loughinisland massacre: Members of the loyalist Ulster Volunteer Force attack a crowded bar at Loughinisland in County Down with assault rifles, killing six.
31 August - The Provisional Irish Republican Army announces a complete cessation of military operations.
6 September - Taoiseach Albert Reynolds, John Hume and Gerry Adams hold an historic meeting at Government Buildings in Dublin. All three pledge their commitment to the democratic idea.
13 October - Loyalist paramilitary groups announce a ceasefire six weeks after the IRA.
Armagh is restored to city status in the United Kingdom.
Lagan Weir in Belfast is completed.
Northern Ireland population estimated to be 1,643,700.

Arts and literature
18 May - Anne Devlin's play After Easter is premiered in Stratford-upon-Avon and wins her the Lloyds Playwright of the Year award.
8 August - Marie Jones' monodrama A Night in November is premiered in Belfast, played by Dan Gordon.
Colin Bateman's Divorcing Jack is published and is awarded the Betty Trask Prize by the Society of Authors, for the best debut by a writer under the age of 35.
Maurice Leitch's novel Gilchrist is published.
Eoin McNamee's novel Resurrection Man is published.
Danny Morrison's novel On The Back of the Swallow is published.
Paul Muldoon's poetry collection The Annals of Chile is published and wins the T. S. Eliot Prize.
The alternative rock band Snow Patrol is formed by students from Northern Ireland at the University of Dundee.

Sport

Football
Irish League
Winners: Linfield

Irish Cup
Winners: Linfield 2 - 0 Bangor

FAI Cup
Winners: Sligo Rovers 1 - 0 Derry City

Motorcycling
Robert Dunlop suffers a major accident at the Isle of Man Formula One TT, putting him out of action for the rest of 1994 and 1995.

Births

Deaths
11 July - Ray Smallwoods, Ulster Democratic Party leader.
19 September - Frankie Kennedy, traditional flute and tin whistle player and  co-founder of Altan (born 1955).

See also
1994 in England
1994 in Scotland
1994 in Wales

References

 
Northern Ireland